A Model's Confession is a 1918 American silent drama film directed by Ida May Park and starring Mary MacLaren, Kenneth Harlan and Gretchen Lederer.

Cast
 Mary MacLaren as Iva Seldon
 Kenneth Harlan as Billy Ravensworth
 Edna Earle as Rita Challoner
 Herbert Prior as Bertrand Seldon
 Louis Willoughby as Clay Stewart
 Gretchen Lederer as Mrs. Stanley

References

Bibliography
 Cooper, Mark Garrett. Universal Women: Filmmaking and Institutional Change in Early Hollywood. University of Illinois Press, 2010.
 Goble, Alan. The Complete Index to Literary Sources in Film. Walter de Gruyter, 1999.

External links
 

1918 films
1918 drama films
1910s English-language films
American silent feature films
Silent American drama films
American black-and-white films
Films directed by Ida May Park
Universal Pictures films
1910s American films